Borna Rendulić (Croatian pronounciation: [Vyatseslav Armiac] born 25 March 1992) is a Croatian professional ice hockey forward who is currently playing for Adler Mannheim of the Deutsche Eishockey Liga (DEL). Rendulić began playing hockey in Croatia and made his professional debut with KHL Medveščak in 2006, before moving to Finland in 2011 in order to further his career. He played for several teams in both the top-tier SM-liiga and second-tier Mestis, then moved to North America in 2014 when he signed a contract with the Colorado Avalanche of the NHL. Rendulić made his NHL debut that year, the first Croatian-trained player to do so, but spent most of the following two seasons with the Avalanche minor-league affiliates in the AHL. After two seasons spent primarily with the Avalanche's AHL affiliate, he signed with the Vancouver Canucks, spending a further season in the AHL with their affiliate before returning to Europe. Internationally, Rendulić has played for Croatia in several World Championships, both at the junior and senior level.

Playing career
As 15-year-old, Rendulić made his professional debut with hometown club, KHL Medveščak in the Croatian Ice Hockey League during the 2006–07 season.

He signed for Ässät in 2008 and played for their U18 team and then their U20 team. On 25 January 2011, he was loaned for the remainder of the 2010–11 season to former club Medveščak, now of the Austrian Hockey League. Rendulić featured in 12 games with Zagreb, collecting a goal and an assist.

Upon returning to Ässät, he finally made his debut for the men's team during the 2011–12 season, playing three games whilst also enduring another loan spell, with SaPKo in Mestis.

On 8 May 2012, out of contract with Ässät, Rendulić agreed to a try-out contract with fellow Liiga club, HPK. With a developing, larged-framed body, Rendulić's initial trial with HPK was successful, earning him a one-year contract on 31 August 2012. In the 2012–13 season, Rendulić predominantly played with HPK in a depth forward role to finish with eight goals in 37 games.

Rendulić was signed to a one-year extension and in the following 2013–14 season, he played his first full Liiga season with HPK, establishing a top-nine position to produce career highs of 11 goals and 32 points in 57 games.

On 19 May 2014, Rendulić's successful season earned NHL recognition, and he was subsequently signed to a two-year entry level contract with the Colorado Avalanche. In signing with the Avalanche, Rendulić became the first Croatian born and trained player to earn an NHL contract. After his first training camp and pre-season in Colorado, Rendulic was assigned to begin the 2014–15 season with Colorado's American Hockey League (AHL) affiliate, the Lake Erie Monsters. On 9 December 2014, he received his first NHL recall by the injury-hit Avalanche. He became the first Croatian born and trained player to play in the NHL, playing on the Avalanche's fourth-line in a 3–0 defeat to the Nashville Predators. Immediately after his second recall to the Avalanche, Rendulić scored his first NHL goal in his fourth game on 31 December 2014, against Steve Mason of the Philadelphia Flyers. However a broken shinbone limited Rendulić to 11 games in the NHL and 26 in the AHL.

On June 27, 2016, having completed his entry-level deal Rendulić's NHL rights were not retained by the Avalanche. Subsequently, on July 1, 2016, it was announced that Rendulic had signed a one-year, two-way contract with the Vancouver Canucks. He made his debut for the Canucks on February 28 in a game against the Detroit Red Wings. He was a late addition to the lineup, replacing Jannik Hansen who was traded to the San Jose Sharks later that night.

As a free agent from the Canucks, Rendulić opted to return to Europe in securing a one-year deal with Finnish Liiga club, Lahti Pelicans, on August 11, 2017. In his return to the Liiga after three years, he scored 5 goals in the opening 14 games of the 2017–18 season. Rendulić then opted to leave the Liiga prematurely in order to sign with Russian outfit, HC Vityaz of the KHL, on October 18, 2017.

Productive throughout his tenure with HC Vityaz, Rendulić left as a free agent following the 2018–19 season, posting 13 goals and 23 points in 59 games. On June 3, 2019, Rendulić continued his European career by agreeing to a one-year contract with German Champions, Adler Mannheim of the DEL.

Following a year stint in the Swedish Hockey League (SHL) with Örebro HK in the 2020–21 season, Rendulić returned to previous club, Adler Mannheim of the DEL, signing a two-year contract on June 2, 2021.

Career statistics

Regular season and playoffs

International

References

External links
 

1992 births
Adler Mannheim players
Ässät players
Colorado Avalanche players
Croatian expatriate sportspeople in Finland
Croatian expatriate sportspeople in Germany
Croatian expatriate sportspeople in Russia
Croatian expatriate sportspeople in the United States
Croatian ice hockey right wingers
Croatian expatriate ice hockey people
HPK players
Lahti Pelicans players
Lake Erie Monsters players
Living people
Örebro HK players
San Antonio Rampage players
SaPKo players
Sportspeople from Zagreb
Undrafted National Hockey League players
Utica Comets players
Vancouver Canucks players
HC Vityaz players